Kirby School District  is a school district headquartered in Kirby, Arkansas.
It is one of three school districts in Pike County.

The district includes Kirby, Daisy, and a small slice of Glenwood.

Schools
 Kirby High School
 Kirby Elementary School

References

Further reading
 (Download) - Includes maps of predecessor districts

External links
  

School districts in Arkansas
Education in Pike County, Arkansas